Elenchus may refer to:
 Elenchus (brachiopod) Gray, 1843, a genus of brachiopods that is a synonym of Weiningia
 Elenchus (insect) Curtis, 1831, a parasitic insect genus in the family Elenchidae
 Elenchus (book), a third-century book also known as Refutation of All Heresies
 Method of elenchus, a form of cooperative argumentative dialogue, that is the central technique of the Socratic method